Beau temps, mauvais temps is a Québécois television series that ran from 1955 to 1958.

Synopsis
Radio-Canada presented 96 episodes of this series, which is set in the small town of Villeneuve. The series tells the story of working- and middle-class youth from the town.

Characters
 Pierre Boucher
 Robert Boulanger
 Elisabeth Briand
 René Caron
 Monique Champagne
 Élizabeth Chouvalidzé
 Gilbert Comptois
 Lucille Cousineau
 Pierre Dagenais
 Pierre Daigneault
 Jean Fontaine
 Marc Forrez
 Marie Fresnières
 Bertrand Gagnon
 Jacques Galipeau
 Roger Garand
 Lucille Gauthier
 Marc Gélinas
 Benoît Girard
 Roger Gravel
 Jocelyn Joty
 Carmen Judd
 Michelle Juneau
 Alexis Kanner
 Suzanne Langlois
 Fernande Larivière
 Lise Lasalle
 Armand Leguet
 Hubert Loiselle
 Thérèse Mackinnon
 Aimé Major
 Jacques Marineau
 Louise Marleau
 Jean-Pierre Masson
 Francine Montpetit
 Denise Morelle
 Marthe Nadeau
 André Pagé
 Lucille Papineau
 Jani Pascal
 Gérard Poirier
 Denjse Provost
 Lucie Ranger
 Louise Rémy
 Madeleine Sicotte
 Olivette Thibault
 Luce Triganne

Set designer
 Lise Lavallée

Directors/Producers
 Jean-Louis Béland
 Paul Blouin
 René Boissay

1950s Canadian drama television series
Black-and-white Canadian television shows
Ici Radio-Canada Télé original programming
Television shows set in Quebec